Tyabb Airport , also called Tyabb Airfield, is a small regional airport located just west of the town of Tyabb, Victoria on the Mornington Peninsula. Tyabb is the site of the Tyabb Air Show, which is held every two years.

See also
 List of airports in Victoria

References

External links
 Peninsula Aero Club
 Tyabb Air Show

Airports in Victoria (Australia)
Buildings and structures in the Shire of Mornington Peninsula